Templin Stadt is a railway station in the town of Templin, Brandenburg, Germany. The station lies of the Löwenberg–Prenzlau railway and the train services are operated by Prignitzer Eisenbahn. The station used to be known as Templin Vorstadt.

Train services
The station is served by the following service(s):

References

External links
VBB website
Berlin-Brandenburg (VBB) network map

Railway stations in Brandenburg
Buildings and structures in Uckermark (district)
Railway stations in Germany opened in 1900